Derrick Lancaster (born January 26, 1973) is an American professional stock car racing driver. He last competed part-time in the ARCA Menards Series, driving the No. 29 Toyota Camry for his own team, Derrick Lancaster Racing.

Racing career 

From 2008 to 2020, Lancaster competed in several late model races, including the NASCAR Advance Auto Parts Weekly Series, the CARS Super Late Model Tour, the Dirty Dozen, and the Virginia Late Model Triple Crown Series. He mostly drove in the Weekly Series, getting 28 top 5s, 78 top 10s, and 1 win, in a stake of 128 starts in 11 years.

ARCA Menards Series 
Lancaster made his ARCA Racing Series (now ARCA Menards Series) start in 2014, driving the No. 56 Dodge Charger for Danny Glad Racing. He drove for them at Daytona International Speedway and Talladega Superspeedway, finishing 13th and 6th respectively.

He returned to Daytona in 2015, this time for his own team, Lancaster Racing. He failed to qualify for the race, and withdrew from Talladega.

He went back to Daytona for 2016, finishing 31st due to an early race wreck, and in 2017, where he finished in 16th after starting 13th.

Derrick took a break from ARCA in 2018 to focus on late model races. He made his ARCA return a year later, driving for On Point Motorsports' No. 29 Toyota Camry.

Kingsport Speedway crash 
On August 7, 2020, Lancaster suffered a serious crash at Kingsport Speedway in Kingsport, Tennessee, where his car got clipped with another car, which sent him head on into the turn 4 wall. The car burst into flames as it slid down the racetrack, with safety and rescue crews arriving on the scene.

The safety and rescue crews extracted him from the car, and he was taken to the Houston Valley Medical Center for an MRI scan, and for further evaluations.

The MRI scan results confirmed that Derrick suffered a hairline fracture, also sometimes called a hangman's fracture. His wife, Elizabeth, says that Derrick will be put in a Cervical collar for 3 months, which would put his racing career on hold. She states that "The worst words Derrick heard today was that he should never race again. Those words nearly killed him. But he knows he is very lucky to be alive.”

Derrick was released from the hospital a month later, where he later had follow-up scans.

ARCA return 
On November 11, 2020, Derrick announced that he will be allowed to race again after being on a Cervical collar for 3 months. He stated “The days following my diagnosis were difficult for me; being told that I should never race again was hard on me considering that’s all I have done since I was 13 years old. Without knowing what the next days, weeks, and months would bring I continued to follow the doctors’ orders and if you know me that was a hard thing for me to do. On November 11, 2020 to my surprise, I was released by my doctor to race again." 

He would return next season and race in the 2021 Lucas Oil 200. He started 14th and would finish 6th, his best career ARCA Menards Series finish.

Talladega crash 
On April 24, 2021, Lancaster was running in 5th at Talladega Superspeedway, when he and Drew Dollar made contact on the backstretch, causing Derrick to hit the outside wall, resulting the car being burst into flames right after impact. He spun his car into the infield grass shortly after the wreck. 

Derrick layed on the ground after he was able to get out of the car, until the NASCAR safety crew arrived to help him walk to the ambulance. 

He was taken to the University of Alabama Birmingham Burn Center for further evaluations. His wife confirmed that Derrick will be put on a ventilator for 48 to 72 hours, while doctors try to assess the lung damage. She also confirmed that Derrick suffered first, second, and third degree burns on his arms, neck, and face, and would later suffer pneumonia. On April 25, Elizabeth confirmed that Derrick was in critical, but stable condition, as doctors found no burns in his lungs or trachea, and on April 27, Derrick was taken off of the ventilator.

He was released from the medical facility on May 4, with the Lancaster family questioning if Derrick should ever race again.

Although he still competes locally, he hasn’t entered a single ARCA race since then.

Support 
On May 1, the drivers competing in the 2021 Dutch Boy 150 at Kansas Speedway, had No. 29 decals on the sides of their cars in support of Lancaster as he was still hospitalized from the incident.

Motorsports career results

ARCA Menards Series 
(key) (Bold – Pole position awarded by qualifying time. Italics – Pole position earned by points standings or practice time. * – Most laps led.)

Personal life 
Derrick currently resides in his hometown in Christiansburg, Virginia, with his wife and three daughters. He is the founder of Total Car & Truck Service, which is located at his race shop in Christiansburg. He graduated from Christiansburg High School in 1991.

References

External links 

1973 births
Living people
ARCA Menards Series drivers
NASCAR drivers
People from Christiansburg, Virginia
Racing drivers from Virginia